Dorjgotovyn Tserenkhand is a retired Mongolian judoka. She won a silver medal at the +78 kg category of the 2006 Asian Games.  She competed at both the 2000 and 2008 Olympics.  In 2008, she finished tied for 5th.

References

External links
 

1977 births
Living people
Sportspeople from Ulaanbaatar
Mongolian female judoka
Olympic judoka of Mongolia
Asian Games medalists in judo
Judoka at the 2002 Asian Games
Judoka at the 2006 Asian Games
Judoka at the 2010 Asian Games
Judoka at the 2000 Summer Olympics
Judoka at the 2008 Summer Olympics
Asian Games silver medalists for Mongolia
Asian Games bronze medalists for Mongolia
Medalists at the 2006 Asian Games
Medalists at the 2010 Asian Games
20th-century Mongolian women
21st-century Mongolian women